Stenodacma wahlbergi is a moth of the family Pterophoridae described by Philipp Christoph Zeller in 1851. It is known from Japan (Honshu, Kyushu, Tsushima), China, Saudi Arabia, Iran, Sri Lanka, India, Central, East and South Africa, St. Helena, Mauritius, the Seychelles and Rodrigues. It has recently been recorded from Vietnam. Records for Australia were based on synonymisation with Stenodacma pyrrhodes.

The length of the forewings is 6–7 mm. Adults emerge from April to October in Japan.

The larvae feed on Oxalis species (including Oxalis corniculata), Ipomoea batatas and  Vitaceae (Vitis indica). They feed on the leaf and pod of the host plant.

References

External links
Taxonomic and Biological Studies of Pterophoridae of Japan (Lepidoptera)
Japanese Moths
Taxonomic Studies on the Superfamily Pterophoroidea from North-Western India

wahlbergi
Moths described in 1851
Moths of the Comoros
Moths of Madagascar
Moths of Mauritius
Moths of the Middle East
Moths of Réunion
Moths of Seychelles
Plume moths of Africa
Plume moths of Asia
Taxa named by Philipp Christoph Zeller
Fauna of Rodrigues